This is a list of the members of the Parliament of Finland from 2003 to 2007. These members were elected at the 2003 Finnish parliamentary election and their term ended with the 2007 Finnish parliamentary election.

List of elected members

References 

2003-2007
2000s in Finland